Assemani is a surname. "Assemani" is an Arabic patronymic which means son of Simeon. 

Notable people with the surname include:

 Giuseppe Simone Assemani (1687–1768), Lebanese Maronite Orientalist
 Stefano Evodio Assemani (1709–1782), nephew of Giuseppe Simone
 Giuseppe Luigi Assemani (1710–1782), nephew of Giuseppe Simone and cousin of Stefano Evodio
 Simone Assemani (1752–1820), grandnephew of Giuseppe Simone

See also
 Codex Assemanius
 Chamoun

Lebanese families
Arabic-language surnames